Democratic Alignment may refer to:

Democratic Alignment (1950), a political party alliance in Greece
Democratic Alignment (2015), a political party alliance in Greece
Democratic Alignment (Cyprus), a political party in Cyprus